Right at Home Realty is an Ontario Real Estate Brokerage with close to 6,000 sales representatives serving the Greater Toronto Area.  The company was founded in 2004 by the late Arthur Bartram, Ronald E. Peddicord, and Howard Drukarsh and has grown into a multi-office, non-franchise, corporately-run Canadian success story.

Based on 2021 Toronto Real Estate Board's sales statistics, Right at Home Realty was the #1 performing Residential Real Estate Brokerage in the Greater Toronto Area for the 9th consecutive year.

Right at Home has ten offices across Ontario in Don Mills, Mississauga, Richmond Hill, Whitby, Vaughan, Burlington, Newmarket, Barrie, and Ottawa with over 5,800 brokers and salespeople.

Right at Home Realty is a member of the Toronto Regional Real Estate Board (TRREB), the Oakville Milton Real Estate Board (OMREB); the Realtors Association of Hamilton-Burlington (RAHB) the Durham Region Association of Realtors (DRAR); the Northhumberland Hills Association of Realtors (NHAB); and the Brampton Real Estate Board (BREB).

Right at Home Realty (RAH) was listed in 2017 by Real Trends as the real estate brokerage with the highest sales in the Greater Toronto Area (GTA), Canada (3.7% of the total, which was split among a great many brokerages).

See also
 Real Estate Institute of Canada (REIC)
 The Canadian Real Estate Association (CREA)
 Ontario Real Estate Association (OREA)
 Real Estate Magazine (REM Online)

External links
 Right At Home Realty Brokerage Attains the #1 Spot in the GTA in Just Ten Years
 Right At Home Realty Donates $57,500 to Habitat for Humanity
 Right At Home Realty Inc. and Dominion Lending Centres announce Partnership
 Right At Home Realty Launches InternetTV with Imagemaker360
 Right At Home Realty Donates $55,000 to Habitat for Humanity
 Right At Home Realty Launches Right At Home University
 Leadership Observations from the Real Estate Industry
 Andrew McLaughlin Joins Right At Home
 Due Diligence for the Salesperson
 Brokerage Stability: Time for Due Diligence
 Right At Home Realty Opens in Whitby and Burlington
 Right At Home Realty to Expand to Whitby
 Right At Home Realty - Corporate site
 Right At Home Realty - Join Us site
 Right At Home Realty - Home Indexer Real Estate Team
 Right At Home Realty Announces New President
 New guys on the block, By: Tony Wong Staff Reporter, Published on Sat Feb 24 2007

Notes 

Real estate companies of Canada